The Banaras Locomotive Works (BLW) (formerly Diesel Locomotive Works (DLW)) in Varanasi, India, is a production unit of Indian Railways. DLW stopped manufacturing diesel locomotives in March 2019 and was renamed BLW in Oct 2020.

History
Founded in 1961 as the DLW, it rolled out its first locomotive three years later, on 3 January 1964. It manufactures locomotives which are variants based on the original ALCO designs dating to 1960s and the GM EMD designs of the 1990s. In July 2006, DLW outsourced manufacture of some locomotives to Parel Workshop, Central Railway, Mumbai. In 2016, it bagged "Best Production Unit Shield 2015-16" The first phase of expansion project of BLW was initiated in 2016. In 2017, it bagged the "Best Production Unit Shield 2016-17" for 2nd consecutive year. In 2018, it bagged the "Best Production Unit Shield 2017-18" of Indian Railways for 3rd consecutive year. In March 2018 it successfully converted two old ALCO diesel loco WDG-3A into an electric loco WAGC-3 (WAG-10), a first in the world. DLW stopped manufacturing diesel locomotives in March 2019 and was renamed BLW in Oct 2020. It was the largest diesel-electric locomotive manufacturer in India. In March 2019, it developed the country's first bi-mode locomotive, the WDAP-5. BLW today produces mostly electric locomotives WAP-7 & WAG-9.

Market
Besides the Indian Railways, BLW regularly exports locomotives to other countries such as Sri Lanka, Nepal, Bangladesh, Mali, Senegal, Tanzania, Angola, Mozambique, and Vietnam and also to a few users within India, such as ports, large power and steel plants and private railways.

See also 
 Chittaranjan Locomotive Works, Asansol
 Patiala Locomotive Works, Patiala
 Diesel Locomotive Factory, Marhowrah
 Electric Locomotive Factory, Madhepura
 Integral Coach Factory, Chennai
Railway Coach Factory, Bhopal
Modern Coach Factory, Raebareli
 Rail Coach Factory, Kapurthala
 Rail Wheel Factory, Yelahanka
 Rail Wheel Plant, Bela
 Titagarh Wagons, Titagarh
 List of locomotive builders by countries

References

External links
 Company website

 
Locomotive manufacturers of India
Buildings and structures in Varanasi
Manufacturing plants in Uttar Pradesh
Economy of Varanasi
1961 establishments in Uttar Pradesh